"Blue Sky" is a song by the American rock band the Allman Brothers Band from their third studio album, Eat a Peach (1972), released on Capricorn Records. The song was written and sung by guitarist Dickey Betts, who penned it about his girlfriend (and later wife), Sandy "Bluesky" Wabegijig. The track is also notable as one of guitarist Duane Allman's final recorded performances with the group. The band's two guitarists, Duane Allman and Dickey Betts, alternate playing the song's lead: Allman's solo beginning 1:07 in, Betts joining in a shared melody line at 2:28, followed by Betts's solo at 2:37. The song is notably more country-inspired than many songs in the band's catalogue.

Background
His debut as a vocalist for the band, Dickey Betts composed "Blue Sky" about his Indigenous Canadian girlfriend, Sandy "Bluesky" Wabegijig, whom he would later marry. The lyrics leave out any references to gender to make it nonspecific: "Once I got into the song I realized how nice it would be to keep the vernaculars—he and she—out and make it like you’re thinking of the spirit, like I was giving thanks for a beautiful day. I think that made it broader and more relatable to anyone and everyone," he later said. Betts initially wanted the band's lead vocalist, Gregg Allman, to sing the song, but guitarist Duane Allman encouraged him to sing it himself: "Man, this is your song and it sounds like you and you need to sing it." An embryonic version of the song can be found on the fan bootleg, The Gatlinburg Tapes, a recording of the band jamming in April 1971 in Gatlinburg, Tennessee.

The song was one of Duane Allman's last recorded performances with the band. "As I mixed songs like "Blue Sky," I knew, of course, that I was listening to the last things that Duane ever played and there was just such a mix of beauty and sadness, knowing there's not going to be any more from him," said Johnny Sandlin.

Alternate versions
While Duane Allman died before Eat a Peach's release, the Band played the song live several times before and after the album's studio version was recorded.  Only one of these performances, recorded live during a September 19, 1971, concert at S.U.N.Y. Stonybrook, has been released by the band; several bootleg recordings from other shows circulate. Two versions of "Blue Sky" were being performed as of 2012: An Allman Brothers take on the SUNY Stony Brook/Eat a Peach original (with Warren Haynes on lead vocals, though Gregg Allman does them sometimes), and an arrangement which evolved between 1973 and 2001 played by Dickey Betts and his band Great Southern.

Cover versions
In 2018 singer and guitarist Frank Hannon released a cover of "Blue Sky" featuring Dickey Betts' son Duane Betts on guitar. Frank Hannon is the son-in-law of Dickey Betts. The cover album titled "From one place...to Another! Vol.1" reached #27 on Billboards Folk / Americana charts.

"Blue Sky" has been covered several times in the past including by Joan Baez on her 1975 album Diamonds & Rust, also released as a single.

Notes

References

Sources

 
 
 

1972 songs
American songs
The Allman Brothers Band songs
Southern rock songs
Country rock songs
Songs written by Dickey Betts
Song recordings produced by Tom Dowd